The two of hearts is a playing card in the standard 52-card deck.

Two of Hearts also refer to:
 Two of Hearts (film), a 1999 television film
 "Two of Hearts" (song), a 1986 song by Stacey Q
"Two of Hearts", an episode from Highlander: The Series (season 6)

See also

 or 

 Three of Hearts (disambiguation)
 Six of Hearts (disambiguation)
 Jack of Hearts (disambiguation)
 Queen of Hearts (disambiguation)
 King of Hearts (disambiguation)
 Ace of Hearts (disambiguation)
 Two Hearts (disambiguation)